Rupert Marko (born 24 November 1963) is a retired Austrian football player and a coach currently managing the Austria U19 team.

External links
 Profile at Austria archiv.

1963 births
Living people
Austrian footballers
Austria international footballers
Austria youth international footballers
Austrian football managers
SK Sturm Graz players
FC Admira Wacker Mödling players
FC Red Bull Salzburg players
FK Austria Wien players
FC Gossau players
Association football forwards
SV Horn managers
FC Swarovski Tirol players
People from Leibnitz
Footballers from Styria